The Sky's the Limit is a 1975 American made-for-television adventure film directed by Tom Leetch, starring Pat O’Brien, Ike Eisenmann and Lloyd Nolan. It was produced by Walt Disney Productions and based on the story by Larry Lenville. The film was originally aired as a two-part episode on The Wonderful World of Disney on January 19 and 26, 1975 on NBC.

Plot
A boy known as Three (Ike Eisenmann), off from school for the summer, reluctantly goes to spend the time on his grandfather's farm. The rural life with his grandfather, Abner (Pat O'Brien) and his only farm hand Cornwall (Lloyd Nolan) is hard for Three to adjust to. This includes a goose that picks on him and an attempt to drive a tractor that goes wrong. However, things change when Three discovers a World War I biplane in the barn and that his grandfather was a flying ace during that war. Three convinces Abner to fix the plane and teach him how to fly.

Cast
Pat O’Brien as Abner Therman
Ike Eisenmann as Three
Lloyd Nolan as Cornwall
Jeanette Nolan as Gertie
Robert Sampson as Two
Alan Hale Jr. as Cholly
Richard Arlen as Grimes
Ben Blue as Ben
Huntz Hall as hitchhiker

Home media
The title has only been released on VHS and DVD.

References

External links

1975 television films
1975 films
1970s adventure films
American aviation films
American adventure films
Walt Disney anthology television series episodes
Disney television films
1970s American films